The Üzülmez coal mine is a coal mine located in the Zonguldak basin of Turkey.

References

External links 

 Üzülmez coal mine on Global Energy Monitor

Coal mines in Turkey
Zonguldak Province